Paul Stephen Aspinwall (born 26 January 1964 in England) is a British theoretical physicist and mathematician, who works on string theory (including dualities, mirror symmetry, D-branes, and Calabi–Yau manifolds) and also algebraic geometry.

Aspinwall received his early education at Bydales School, Marske-by-the-Sea and Prior Pursglove College, Guisborough. He then studied at the University of Oxford with a focus on theoretical elementary particle physics. He received his bachelor's degree in 1985 and his Ph.D. in 1991. He is now a professor of mathematics and physics at Duke University in Durham, North Carolina.

In 1998 he was an Invited Speaker with talk (String theory and duality) at the ICM in Berlin. In 1999 he was a Sloan Fellow.

Selected publications
 as editor: Dirichlet branes and mirror symmetry, Clay School on Geometry and String Theory, Cambridge 2002, Clay Mathematics Monographs, American Mathematical Society 2009
 
 with Brian Greene, David R. Morrison: Spacetime topology change: the physics of Calabi–Yau Moduli Space, in Strings 93, World Scientific 1995, Arxiv
 
 Compactification, Geometry and Duality: N=2, TASI Lectures 1999, Arxiv
 K3 surfaces and string duality, TASI Lectures 1996, World Scientific 1997, Arxiv
 
 
 
 
 
 
 
 
 
 
 The moduli space of N=2 superconformal field theories, in: Gava (ed.), 1994 summer school in high energy physics and cosmology, World Scientific 1995, Arxiv

References

External links
Paul S. Aspinwall's homepage at Duke University

1964 births
Living people
British string theorists
Alumni of the University of Oxford
Duke University faculty